Arsène Menessou Gbougnon (born 3 December 1987) is a Beninese professional footballer who plays for FC Schifflange 95, as a right back. Between 2011 and 2013, he made nine appearances for the Benin national team.

Career
Born in Abidjan, Ivory Coast, Menessou has played club football for Le Havre B, Beauvais, Real Zaragoza B, Eupen, La Louvière Centre, Virton, Jeunesse Esch and Hamm Benfica.

He made his international debut for Benin in 2011.

References

1987 births
Living people
Footballers from Abidjan
Ivorian footballers
Beninese footballers
Benin international footballers
Association football fullbacks
Le Havre AC players
AS Beauvais Oise players
Real Zaragoza B players
K.A.S. Eupen players
UR La Louvière Centre players
R.E. Virton players
Jeunesse Esch players
FC RM Hamm Benfica players
Beninese expatriate footballers
Beninese expatriate sportspeople in France
Expatriate footballers in France
Beninese expatriate sportspeople in Spain
Expatriate footballers in Spain
Beninese expatriate sportspeople in Belgium
Expatriate footballers in Belgium
Beninese expatriate sportspeople in Luxembourg
Expatriate footballers in Luxembourg